Andrés Ravecca Cadenas (born 2 January 1988 in Montevideo) is a Uruguayan footballer currently playing as a right-back for Deportivo Maldonado of the Uruguayan primera División.

Career statistics

Club

Notes

References

1989 births
Living people
Uruguayan footballers
Association football defenders
Footballers from Montevideo
C.A. Cerro players
Liverpool F.C. (Montevideo) players
Deportivo Maldonado players
Uruguayan Primera División players
Uruguayan Segunda División players